The Canadian Soccer Association (Canada Soccer) is the governing body of soccer in Canada. It is a national organization that oversees the Canadian men's and women's national teams for international play, as well as the respective junior sides (U-20 and U-17 for men and women). Within Canada, it oversees national professional and amateur club championships.

Organization and governance
Canada Soccer's objectives, as described in its by-laws, are to:
  promote, regulate and control the game of soccer throughout Canada, particularly through youth and development programs;
  organize competitions in Association Football in all its forms at a national level, by defining the areas of authority conceded to the various leagues of which it is composed;
   draw up Association Football regulations and provisions, and ensure their enforcement;
   protect the interests of its Members;
   respect and prevent any infringement of the statutes, regulations, directives and decisions of FIFA, CONCACAF and The CSA, as well as the Laws of the Game;
   prevent all methods or practices that jeopardize the integrity of matches or competitions or give rise to abuse of Association Football;
   control and supervise all friendly Association Football matches played throughout Canada;
   manage international sporting relations connected with Association Football;
   host competitions at international and other levels.

Canada Soccer is governed by a board of directors consisting of 14 directors: a President, Vice President, six elected directors, and six appointed or independent directors. Each of the six elected directors is elected from one of six geographic regions. The board must include at least three men and three women. The president of the board is Victor Montagliani and the vice president is Steven Reed.

Canada Soccer is administered by the General Secretariat, which is led by general secretary Peter Montopoli and deputy general secretary Earl Cochrane. The general secretary is the chief executive of Soccer Canada, and is appointed by the board of directors. The head office is located in Ottawa, Ontario.

Canada Soccer is a member of FIFA and of CONCACAF.

History

The Dominion of Canada Football Association, today known as the Canadian Soccer Association, was founded in Winnipeg, Manitoba in July 1912. "At the meeting, the Manitoba Football Association joined with the provincial associations of Ontario, New Ontario, Quebec, Saskatchewan and Alberta to form the national association." The organization joined FIFA on December 31, 1912. On June 21, 1926, the DCFA resigned from FIFA, only to rejoin on June 20, 1948. The governing body of the game retained that name until it was changed to The Football Association of Canada on June 6, 1952. The association later changed its name to the Canadian Soccer Football Association in 1958 and then at last to the Canadian Soccer Association in 1971.

In July 2022, an independent review summarized in a 125-page report by McLaren Global Sport Solution, commissioned by Canada Soccer, concluded that Canada Soccer mishandled sexual harassment allegations in 2008 against then Canada U-20 women's soccer coach Bob Birarda, who was later found guilty three counts of sexual assault. It said Canada Soccer was "described by many as being dysfunctional and inefficient" in 2007 and 2008, and concluded among other things that "harassment was not a priority issue amongst the senior Canadian Soccer Association leadership team" at the time.

In 2022, Canada Soccer newly appointed Secretary General Earl Cochrane said: "We are going to be leaders in this SafeSport – through policy, practice, programs."

National teams

The association's national teams have won nine confederation championships. Canada won the 1985 CONCACAF Men's Championship and the 2000 CONCACAF Gold Cup; Canada's women's "A" team won the 1998 and 2010 CONCACAF women's championships. The men's youth team won the 1986 and 1996 CONCACAF Under-20 Championship while the women's youth team won the 2004 and 2008 CONCACAF Women's U-20 Championship along with the 2010 CONCACAF Women's U-17 Championship.

Men

The Canada men's national soccer team represents Canada in international soccer competitions at the senior men's level. They are overseen by the Canadian Soccer Association and compete in the Confederation of North, Central American and Caribbean Association Football (CONCACAF).
Their most significant achievements are winning the 1985 CONCACAF Championship to qualify for the 1986 FIFA World Cup, winning the 2000 CONCACAF Gold Cup to qualify for the 2001 FIFA Confederations Cup and qualifying for the 2022 FIFA World Cup. A Canadian club team won a gold medal in the 1904 Summer Olympics. Canada with Mexico and the United States will jointly host the 2026 FIFA World Cup in the first 48-team event.

Women

The Canada women's national soccer team represents Canada in international women's soccer and is directed by the Canadian Soccer Association. Canada hosted the 2015 FIFA Women's World Cup and reached the quarterfinals.
The team reached international prominence at the 2003 FIFA Women's World Cup, losing in the third place match to the United States. Canada qualified for its first Olympic women's soccer tournament in 2008, making it to the quarterfinals. Canada are two-time CONCACAF women's champions as well as Olympic bronze medallists from London 2012 where they defeated France 1–0 and the 2016 Olympics in Brazil. Canada won the gold medal at the 2020 Olympics in Tokyo.

Hosted international tournaments
The association has hosted several FIFA tournaments: the FIFA U-16 World Championship (1987), the FIFA U-20 Women's World Cup (2002, 2014), the FIFA U-20 World Cup (2007), the FIFA Women's World Cup (2015), and will co-host the FIFA World Cup (2026) along with Mexico and United States.

Leagues and cups

At the professional level, Canada's domestic cup is the Canadian Championship. The Canadian Championship is an annual soccer tournament contested by premier Canadian professional teams. The winner is awarded the Voyageurs Cup and Canada's berth in the CONCACAF Champions League
In 2008, the Montreal Impact won the inaugural competition ahead of Toronto FC and Vancouver Whitecaps FC. By finishing first, the Impact won the Voyageurs Cup and qualified for the 2008–09 CONCACAF Champions League. Canada's best performance in the CONCACAF Champions League came in the 2014–15 competition, when Montreal Impact reached the finals. Toronto FC also reached the final in the 2018 CONCACAF Champions League where they fell in penalties to C.D. Guadalajara. Starting in 2019, the winner of the Canadian Premier League has qualified for the CONCACAF League.

Joining inaugural Canadian Championship participants Montreal, Toronto and Vancouver, FC Edmonton entered the competition in 2011, and the Ottawa Fury entered in 2014. Starting in 2018, the winners of both League1 Ontario and Première ligue de soccer du Québec, enter in the first qualifying round of the competition. With the launch of the Canadian Premier League in 2019, all CPL teams also play in the Canadian Championship. It is organized by the Canadian Soccer Association. The champion of League1 British Columbia, the new Division III semi-professional league, will enter the 2023 Canadian Championships.

Amateur and youth
At the amateur level, Canada's club competitions fall under the National Championships. The senior champions are awarded the Challenge Trophy (men) and Jubilee Trophy (women). Club championships are also organized at the U-17, and U-15 levels.

Affiliates

Senior level
Canada men's national beach soccer team
Canada men's national cerebral palsy soccer team
Canada men's national futsal team
Canada men's national soccer team
Canada women's national soccer team

Youth sides
Canada men's national under-17 soccer team
Canada men's national under-20 soccer team
Canada men's national under-23 (Olympic) soccer team
Canada women's national under-17 soccer team
Canada women's national under-20 soccer team

Leagues and organizations

Canadian Premier League (CPL)
League1 British Columbia (L1BC)
League1 Ontario (L1O)
Première ligue de soccer du Québec (PLSQ)

Canada Soccer is a financial backer of the U.S. National Women's Soccer League, which launched in 2013 as that country's third attempt at a women's professional league. Specifically, Canada Soccer is paying the NWSL salaries of 16 national team players.

List of presidents

Staff

See also

Canada men's national soccer team
Canada women's national soccer team
Canadian soccer league system
Soccer in Canada

References

External links

 Canada at CONCACAF site
 Canada at FIFA site
 Canada Soccer Records & Results 2021
 Canadian Soccer Referees' Association
 

 
1912 establishments in Canada
Sports organizations established in 1912
 
CONCACAF member associations
Soccer
Association football governing bodies in North America
Sport in Ottawa